Anthony Duvale Grant (born April 15, 1966) is an American basketball coach who is the head men's basketball coach at the University of Dayton. Prior to that, he was the head coach at Virginia Commonwealth University from 2006 to 2009, and at the University of Alabama from 2009 to 2015. Prior to becoming the VCU head coach, he was an assistant coach at the University of Florida from 1996 to 2006.

Biography

Early life
After graduating from Miami Senior High School, Grant became an All-City first-team selection and Player-of-the-Year.  He played at the University of Dayton from 1983 to 1987 while residing at 3 Evanston (The Gateway) and guiding them to the Elite Eight of the NCAA Tournament before bowing out to eventual national champion Georgetown. As a sophomore, Grant averaged 10.7 points a game and 6.5 rebounds a game and the Flyers again made it to the NCAA Tournament. As a junior, the 6'5" Grant moved from power forward to small forward and averaged 7.1 points a game and 4.8 rebounds a contest while the team advanced to the National Invitation Tournament. As a senior, Grant was named a team captain, was awarded team MVP, and won the Sharpenter Memorial Rebounding Award after leading the squad in scoring and rebounding, averaging 13.0 and 6.0 respectively. In his 105 appearances, Grant averaged 11.6 points and 6.7 rebounds. In 1987, Grant spent a year playing for the Miami Tropics of the United States Basketball League.

In 1987, Grant became an assistant coach and math teacher at Miami Senior High School under Marcos "Shaky" Rodriguez.

Coaching career

Assistant coach
The Miami native served for ten years as an assistant to Billy Donovan at the University of Florida (UF). The 1999 and 2000 teams made the first back-to-back Sweet 16 appearances in school history and the 2000 squad made UF's first appearance in the National Championship game, where they lost to Michigan State. In the spring of 2002, Grant was elevated to the title of Associate Head Coach after serving as an assistant for his first six seasons.

Grant played a key role in helping the Gators to the 2006 NCAA title, the 2005 and 2006 Southeastern Conference tournament titles, three SEC Eastern Division titles and back-to-back SEC Championships in 2000 and 2001.  The Gators reached eight straight NCAA Tournaments, capped by the national title in 2006 in which Florida became the first team since the 1968 UCLA Bruins to win both the national semifinal and the final by at least 15 points. The Gators were 226–98 (.698) during Grant's 10-year stint in Gainesville. Prior to the University of Florida, Grant served as an assistant to Donovan for two years at Marshall University helping them to a 35–20 record. Grant also served as an assistant coach during the 1993–94 season at Stetson.

Virginia Commonwealth
Grant led VCU to a 79–77 upset of 6th seeded Duke to reach the 2nd round of the 2007 NCAA tournament. Two of Grant's VCU players were drafted as first round draft picks in the 2009 (Eric Maynor) and 2010 NBA drafts (Larry Sanders).

Alabama

On March 27, 2009 Grant agreed in principle to become the twentieth head men's basketball coach at the University of Alabama.

In Grant's first season at Alabama, the Crimson Tide went 17–15 (6–10), winning their last two regular season games to clinch a winning record and the 4th seed in the west in the 2010 SEC men's basketball tournament. They would go on to lose in the quarterfinals to #2 Kentucky.
 
In his second season at the Capstone, Grant's young team struggled early in the season, going 8–6 during non-conference play, but bounced back, going 12–4 in SEC play, to win the SEC Western Division title. Grant also got his first "signature" win, when Alabama defeated #12 Kentucky in Coleman Coliseum, 68–66. Dick Vitale has noted Grant as one of his "Coaches on the Rise". He guided Alabama to the NIT Final in Madison Square Garden in only his second year.

Grant reached the 2012 NCAA tournament in his third season. That marked Alabama's first appearance since 2006. However, it was short-lived; the Tide lost to Creighton in the opening round of the tournament.

In Grant's fourth season at Alabama, the Crimson Tide started strong but struggled in December due to injuries. The Tide finished a surprising 12–6 in SEC play, tied for 2nd place in the league. After winning one game in the SEC Basketball Tournament, the Tide lost to Florida the next day, 61–51. Grant's team lost to Miami in the National Invitation Tournament quarterfinals by a score of 58–57.

On March 15, 2015, Grant was fired from Alabama.

NBA
On June 29, 2015, Grant was hired by the Oklahoma City Thunder to be an assistant coach under coach Billy Donovan.

Dayton
On March 30, 2017, the University of Dayton announced that Grant would be the program's new head coach after the departure of Archie Miller to Indiana University.

For the 2019–20 season, Grant was named the Sporting News National Coach of the Year and Naismith College Coach of the Year, following the team's 29–2 record and third place finish in the AP Poll ranking. The team was unable to compete in the March Madness tournament due to the COVID-19 pandemic.

Head coaching record

*Grant was fired prior to the 2015 NIT and did not coach in the Tide's two NIT games.

References

External links
 Dayton profile

1966 births
Living people
African-American basketball coaches
African-American basketball players
Alabama Crimson Tide men's basketball coaches
American men's basketball coaches
American men's basketball players
Basketball coaches from Florida
Basketball players from Miami
College men's basketball head coaches in the United States
Dayton Flyers men's basketball coaches
Dayton Flyers men's basketball players
Florida Gators men's basketball coaches
High school basketball coaches in Florida
Marshall Thundering Herd men's basketball coaches
Miami Senior High School alumni
Oklahoma City Thunder assistant coaches
Power forwards (basketball)
Small forwards
Sports coaches from Miami
Stetson Hatters men's basketball coaches
VCU Rams men's basketball coaches
21st-century African-American people
20th-century African-American sportspeople